Mick Saxby (born 12 August 1957) is an English former footballer who played in the Football League for Mansfield Town, Luton Town, Grimsby Town, Lincoln City, Newport County and Middlesbrough.

References

English footballers
English Football League players
1959 births
Living people
Mansfield Town F.C. players
Luton Town F.C. players
Grimsby Town F.C. players
Lincoln City F.C. players
Newport County A.F.C. players
Middlesbrough F.C. players
Oakham United F.C. (Nottinghamshire) players
People from Newark and Sherwood (district)
Association football defenders